A Son of Satan is a 1924 silent race film directed, written, produced and distributed by Oscar Micheaux. The film follows the misadventures of a man who accepted a bet to spend a night in a haunted house. Micheaux shot the film in The Bronx, New York, and Roanoke, Virginia.

A Son of Satan ran into distribution problems when state censorship boards rejected the film based on its contents. New York censors objected to the film’s depiction of violence, particularly against women and animals (a cat is killed onscreen in one scene, a Ku Klux Klan leader is slain, and a man chokes his wife to death), while Virginia censors complained the film’s references to miscegenation would "prove offensive to Southern ladies". In at least one state the film was banned for its title alone

No print of the film is known to exist and it is presumed to be a lost film.
Micheaux Film Corporation production; distributed by Micheaux Film Corporation. / Produced by Oscar Micheaux. Scenario by Oscar Micheaux. / Standard 35mm spherical 1.37:1 format. / Working title: The Ghost of Tolston’s Manor. The production began shooting on March 26, 1923, in the Bronx, New York. Some location photography was taken in Roanoke, Virginia, and in Clason’s Point, New York. Approximately 20,000 feet of film was shot during production. The film was granted a New York State exhibition license on September 18, 1924.

Cast
Andrew S. Bishop
Lawrence Chenault
Emmett Anthony (1889–1931)
Edna Morton
Monte Hawley
Shingzie Howard
Ida Anderson
 E. G. Tatum
Dink Stewart
W. B. F. Crowell
Olivia Sewall
Mildred Smallwood
 Blanche Thompson
Margaret Brown
 Professor Hosay

Some of the original cast from the hit Broadway musicals Shuffle Along and Runnin' Wild appear in the movie, including Aubrey Lyles and F. E. Miller, Adelaide Hall, Arthur Cooper, Mildred Baker, Ina Duncan, and Arthur Porter.

References

External links
 

Lost horror films
Films directed by Oscar Micheaux
American black-and-white films
American silent feature films
Race films
American haunted house films
American comedy horror films
African-American films
1920s comedy horror films
Lost American films
1924 lost films
1924 comedy films
1924 films
1920s American films
Silent comedy-drama films
Silent horror films
Silent American drama films
Silent American comedy films